Butternut Lake is a lake in Meeker County, in the U.S. state of Minnesota.

Butternut Lake was named for the butternut trees near the lake.

See also
List of lakes in Minnesota

References

Lakes of Minnesota
Lakes of Meeker County, Minnesota